Nicky Barnes (28 August 1941 – 2008) was an Australian water polo player. He competed at the 1964 Summer Olympics and the 1972 Summer Olympics.

References

1941 births
2008 deaths
Australian male water polo players
Olympic water polo players of Australia
Water polo players at the 1964 Summer Olympics
Water polo players at the 1972 Summer Olympics
Place of birth missing